Rita C. Davidson (September 1, 1928 – November 11, 1984) was a lawyer and public servant who was the first woman to serve on the Maryland Court of Appeals.

Davidson was born in Brooklyn, New York City, the daughter of Lithuanian and Latvian Jewish immigrants by way of Russia. She graduated from Goucher College in 1948 and Yale Law School in 1951.

She worked in private practice in Washington, D.C. and was active in politics in Montgomery County, Maryland. In 1970, Governor Marvin Mandel appointed her as the secretary of Employment and Social Services, the first woman named to a Maryland governor's cabinet.

In 1972, Davidson was appointed to the Maryland Court of Special Appeals. In 1978, acting governor Blair Lee III appointed her to the Maryland Court of Appeals. Davidson was the first woman appointed to the state's highest court.

Davidson died of cancer on November 11, 1984, at her home in Chevy Chase, Maryland.

See also
List of female state supreme court justices

References

1928 births
1984 deaths
Goucher College alumni
Yale Law School alumni
Judges of the Maryland Court of Appeals
20th-century American judges
20th-century American women lawyers
Deaths from cancer in Maryland
People from Brooklyn
Lawyers from Washington, D.C.
20th-century American lawyers
20th-century American women judges
American people of Lithuanian-Jewish descent
American people of Latvian-Jewish descent